Hugh "Wee Hughie" Campbell is a fictional character, and the main protagonist of the comic book series The Boys, created by Garth Ennis and Darick Robertson and visually designed after Simon Pegg. He is a member of The Boys, a group of vigilantes led by Billy Butcher, and the self-declared archenemy of A-Train. After the death of his girlfriend Robin at A-Train's hands, he joins The Boys to get vengeance on "Supes" (i.e. "superpowered" or "superhuman" individuals, often acting as "superheroes") artificially created by the mega-conglomerate Vought. He later becomes the love interest of Annie January / Starlight, while also becoming increasingly ruthless and savage under Butcher's influence as the series progresses. 

Hughie is portrayed by Jack Quaid in the Amazon Prime Video streaming television adaptation and resulting franchise, developed by Eric Kripke, with Simon Pegg portraying his father in the first and third seasons; while Pegg was originally attached to star in the series as Hughie, before development hell rendered him too old for the role, he would eventually voice the character in the animated anthology series The Boys Presents: Diabolical.

Appearances

Comic book series

The Boys, Herogasm, and Highland Laddie (2006–2011)

Hughie grew up in rural Scotland, an adopted child.[2] He had a rather bizarre childhood, including a period of trauma from exposure to a giant tapeworm, the shock of being present when an airline pilot suddenly has a mental breakdown mid-flight, and a childhood friend nicknamed Det (Horace Bronson), with an unnaturally powerful stench. With his childhood friends, he played at being a boy detective; they had actually discovered a cigarette smuggling operation handled by a local pub owner. During a later outing, they threw stones at a dog, only for Hughie to get upset when one of his throws hit its mark, and out of guilt would spend the evening taking the injured dog back to its home. As an adult, he'd leave for Glasgow. His relationship with his parents and childhood friends has him being irritated by how they sometimes treat him, while outside viewers (Annie and Mallory) have pointed out he's lucky to have them.

Despite his embarrassment at his childhood adventures, they reveal his natural talent as a detective, as he quickly picks up the task of surveillance with the Boys. He is able to reason out the murder of a young gay man by Swingwing, as well as the motive behind it; he is able to sort out the motivations of a Russian gangster enough to track her flight, even if he is too late to catch her; and he is able to piece together Butcher's ultimate plan where the rest of The Boys were unaware such a plan existed.

Hughie first experiences the world of superhumans firsthand when his girlfriend, Robin, is accidentally killed by A-Train during a fight in which the latter is subduing another "Supe" while traveling faster than the speed of sound. The other Supe is thrown at high speed into Robin, and both of them hit a nearby brick wall, instantly killing Robin and leaving Hughie holding her now severed hands and forearms. Due to this experience, Butcher recruits him to take Mallory's vacated spot on the Boys, and would later inject him with Compound V, without Hughie's permission.

Early on, Hughie's inexperience has resulted in him becoming hesitant in his actions. Shortly after his first combat experience, which results in his accidental killing of Blarney Cock, he becomes extremely worried about repeating the action, which nearly results in the escape of Swingwing in a subsequent operation. He also would become gradually disgusted with Butcher's easy willingness to torture their enemies and the others' lack of caring about it. As the series progressed, and the bloodshed gradually increased, Hughie would also grow angry with Butcher's dismissal of the constant violence ("big boys' rules") used in their operations.

Despite his distaste with the antics he observes while a member of the Boys, he has developed a pair of close relationships within the community. He has made friends with the Russian hero Vas and, unknowingly, the super-heroine Annie "Starlight" January, the latter with whom he develops a romantic relationship, causing Butcher to wonder, upon his discovery of the relationship, if Hughie was working for Vought-American. After becoming assured that he wasn't, Butcher decides to sabotage their relationship up by setting Hughie up to see footage of Annie's "induction" into the Seven. Unable to cope with the knowledge, he angrily breaks off the relationship, only to suffer guilt over his verbal abuse with her; the two reconciled and got back together. He finally comes clean to her in #55 about his work, and begs her to leave and hide for her safety when the conflict between the Boys and Vought escalates.

Hughie is viewed as a genuinely decent guy by most people who know him, and he has several times risked himself to try to help people who were vulnerable or victimized: his rage over Swingwing callously killing a young man in #10, his attempts to save G-Wiz, and trying to fight the horrifically powerful Malchemical to defend Superduper in #43. Butcher was confused and irritated by the latter incidents, as he had advised him several times that the superhuman population largely does not care about normal people and are not worth his concern. The "Highland Laddie" miniseries had Hughie feeling discontent that, unlike Butcher, he isn't a hard man, but he seems incapable of being one. Annie would later tell him that he is just too nice because of his upbringing, but that this doesn't make him any less of a man.

In Herogasm #3, he is sexually assaulted by Black Noir. While left shocked and sickened over it, he does not say what happened to the other Boys until much later in time. Due to the fact the confession is timed right after their Flatiron Building office was attacked, it was largely met with indifference.

Over the Hill with the Swords of a Thousand Men (2012)

During the events of the attempted coup of the US Government by Homelander, Butcher captures A-Train with the hopes of getting Hughie to finally understand what it means to be one of The Boys. He makes Hughie listen to recorded conversations of them discussing Robin, hoping to convince him to murder A-Train. Hughie can't bring himself to kill the captured man, so Butcher starts playing further conversations of the Seven – a tactic Hughie sees through and refuses to be provoked by, demanding Butcher to stop. However, when the tape reaches the Seven's plan to hire Annie so they can degrade her, Hughie finally snaps and kicks A-Train's head off.

The Bloody Doors Off (2012)

In the aftermath of the fight with the Seven, the Boys are disbanded, Annie leaves Hughie because she is unable to accept his true allegiance, and Vas is killed. It becomes clear that Butcher has been trying to get the team out of the way so he can carry out a mass murder of superhumans, even though the act will also likely kill those who only have trace amounts of V in their system – which, based on the accidental exposures of Compound V, would mean the deaths of billions of people. After Billy then kills Mother's Milk, Frenchie, and the Female to prevent them from interfering, Hughie realizes that Billy needs to be stopped and prepares by going to Mother's Milk's home and drinking his mother's Supe-enhancing breast milk, allowing him to match the far stronger and older Billy. The two then engage each other, ultimately ending in Hughie paralyzing Billy. Not wanting to spend the remainder of his life in prison, Billy tricks Hughie into believing he had murdered his parents, leading to Hughie beating him to death. Hughie and Annie subsequently reunite and decide to give their relationship another shot. 

Six months later, Hughie arrives at the Brooklyn Bridge to leave his memorial to his fallen friends and to leave a final ultimatum for James Stillwell for Vought-American (now American Consolidated) going forward, inadvertently driving Stillwell insane.

Dear Becky (2020)
Twelve years later, as Hughie and Annie prepare to finally marry, Hughie is sent Billy's diary by an unknown individual, leading him to confront his past actions. In the end, Hughie and Annie officially marry in his hometown, and finally moves on from Billy and the Boys for good.

Television series

The Boys (2019–present)

In the streaming television series adaptation, Jack Quaid portrays the character. In the series, he is American instead of Scottish and initially works at a computer hardware store, and his father is portrayed by Simon Pegg. Hughie's mother left the family when he was six. He is also characterized as a fan of Billy Joel.

Season One (2019)

In season one, Hughie's girlfriend, Robin Ward, is killed by A-Train in the first episode, as in the comics. With the help of Billy Butcher, he reluctantly decides to take vengeance on the Supes and joins his team, nicknamed "The Boys", which includes Frenchie, Mother's Milk "MM", and later Kimiko / The Female. Butcher relates to Hughie as his wife, Becca, was raped by Homelander and vanished afterwards. As Translucent confronts and attacks Hughie for planting a bugging device at the Vought International headquarters, Butcher helps Hughie knock him out, and a series of misadventures results in Translucent being held hostage by the Boys and later killed by Hughie himself. Hughie moves out of his father's apartment and continues on with the Boys' escapades, acting as their computer specialist, though he often experiences friction with Butcher and is constantly shell-shocked by the amount of carnage their missions cause. He also befriends Annie January, later finding out her identity as Starlight, and they enter a relationship despite Butcher's disapproval. The Boys discover Compound V and its role in the creation of Supes, finding a way to blackmail A-Train, who is addicted to the substance and was under its influence when he ran through Robin. Annie is shocked when she discovers Hughie's association with the Boys and the truth about Compound V, but she helps him free MM, Frenchie, and Kimiko when they are abducted.

Season Two (2020)

In season two, Hughie and the Boys, sans Butcher, go underground when they are marked as fugitives as a result of Butcher's alleged murder of Madelyn Stillwell. The Boys must deal with a "head-popper" assassin who kills their victims by telepathically popping their heads, in addition to Stormfront, the newest addition to the Seven, who is secretly a Nazi and the first Supe ever created by Vought. After several failed attempts to investigate Vought and to recruit assistance from the CIA, the latter ending with the assassination of Assistant Director Susan Raynor by the head-popper, Frenchie contacts Butcher due to their need for a "captain". Butcher and Hughie's rift grows. Butcher punches Hughie and threatens him with death after interfering with the capture of the "supervillain" Kenji, Kimiko's younger brother, as it potentially jeopardized his chance of reuniting with Becca (although, Butcher later apologizes, to which Hughie attempts to punch him in retaliation); Butcher downplays the Boys' achievement of leaking the existence of Compound V to the media, much to Hughie's chagrin; and Butcher abandons a traumatized Hughie inside a whale that the former drove a boat into. However, their relationship begins to be repaired after MM asserts that Hughie is Butcher's "canary" (whose death would signal when Butcher went too far), and after Hughie learns about the suicide of Butcher's brother Lenny, and his physical resemblance to him. Annie, disillusioned by Vought, decides to secretly help the Boys and meets with Hughie at remote locations to exchange information, occasionally joining them in-person for certain missions. Hughie reaches a breaking point, but later learns to be more assertive and stands up to Butcher more. He rescues Annie with Lamplighter when she is caught and imprisoned by Vought, then later helps Butcher and Becca save her son, Ryan, from Homelander and Stormfront. In the end, Hughie, Annie, and the Boys are exonerated, and Hughie decides to work for congresswoman Victoria Neuman, unaware that she is the head-popper.

Season Three (2022)

In season three, Hughie investigates Neuman's past after discovering she is the head-popper. After discovering that she is in fact the secret adoptive daughter of Vought CEO Stan Edgar, and her anti-Vought policies to be controlled opposition, he reaches out to Butcher to reform the Boys and take down Vought "his way", a decision leading to his own steady disillusionment. After learning Butcher had been taking a temporary version of Compound V dubbed "V-24", Hughie secretly takes some himself while on a mission to Russia to find a superweapon supposedly able to kill Homelander, acquiring the ability to teleport (although losing his clothes with each teleportation) along with a superhuman strength and durability. Hughie then joins Butcher in recruiting the Supe Soldier Boy to their cause after accidentally freeing him from Russian captivity. Hughie alienates himself from Annie, defending his use of V24 by saying that "for once" he wishes to be able to  save her despite her insistence she does not need saving. Whilst on a mission to kill Soldier Boy's former Payback teammate Mindstorm, Hughie betrays Soldier Boy after he leaves a mesmerized Butcher for dead, and learning that Soldier Boy's reputation as a war hero was just propaganda; Mindstorm revives Butcher, who Hughie referred to as "family", though Soldier Boy kills him before Hughie can deliver on his promise to teleport him to safety. After Butcher punches him unconscious and abandons him in a gas station bathroom to prevent him from taking another potentially fatal dose of V24 (albeit without telling him after learning from Annie about the fact), Hughie comes to the realization that he did not need V24 for strength, relaying to Annie how his father provided for him after his mother left. Realizing that Butcher tried to save him, Hughie tries to save Butcher in turn. During the finale, Hughie is nearly tempted to take another vial of V24 when Annie engages Soldier Boy, but instead decides to enhance Annie's powers by turning up the lighting in Seven Tower, enabling her to levitate and momentarily knock Soldier Boy down. In the aftermath of the fight, Hughie and the other Boys welcome Annie as she throws away her Starlight costume and officially joins the team.

Death Battle! (2020)

In the 2020 Amazon Prime Video-sponsored The Boys promotional episodes of Death Battle!, the "gremlin" Hughie Campbell is depicted via archive footage of Jack Quaid from the series' first season as Death Battle! hosts Wiz & Boomstick discuss the Boys and the Seven with Black Noir, prior to the Seven's simulated battle royale.

Seven on 7 (2022)

In the Vought News Network: Seven on 7 with Cameron Coleman first season finale "January 2022", set between the events of the second and third seasons of The Boys, Hughie is interviewed by Cameron Coleman about Victoria Neuman's policies, with Jack Quaid reprising his role from the television series.

Diabolical (2022)

In The Boys Presents: Diabolical episode "I'm Your Pusher", set in the same continuity as the Boys comic book series, Wee Hughie (voiced by Simon Pegg) and Butcher confront OD, a drug dealer who deals directly to Vought Supes, and blackmails him into tainting the Great Wide Wounder's drugs, causing him to crash into Ironcast during a promotional campaign, killing them both. After Butcher tells OD about the pair's crimes, Wee Hughie walks away with him, uneasy.

Powers and abilities
Hughie Campbell was a typical, average and regular male, possessing no superpowers or extraordinary abilities, until he was injected with a shot of the enhancement drug Compound V. The dosage applied to Wee Hughie was worth 19 billion dollars. This gives Hughie superhuman levels of strength and durability, the likes of which means he can casually injure and kill regular humans as well as some superhumans. In the show, Hughie gains the power of teleportation, accelerated healing, and superhuman strength after taking a temporary variant of Compound V, however he is only able to teleport himself and not his clothes, leaving him naked when he rematerialises.

Development

Hughie is intentionally drawn to resemble the British actor and writer Simon Pegg. According to Robertson, he drew the character based on Pegg after seeing him in the sitcom Spaced, and thought that Pegg captured the balance of "innocence but tough determination" that Ennis wanted in the character. When asked about playing Hughie in a possible movie adaptation of The Boys, Pegg thought that he might be too old to play the role. In the television series, Pegg plays the recurring part of Hughie's father.

Ennis has said that Hughie has a "total inability to learn from his mistakes and change his ways [which] will eventually stand him in good stead... No doubt Hughie's tendency to mope and turn inwards is a source of frustration to many readers, all used to comic heroes who learn from experience and develop into fully-rounded characters ready to handle anything. In my experience this is like no one who's ever existed in real life; even the most capable people either maintain or eventually return to their essential flaws. I doubt any twenty-something lad unused to trauma and violence could simply absorb it straightaway, and if he did become hardened or inured it would be as a different, less sensitive person. In other words, Hughie's bizarre triumph is that he remains Hughie."

Reception
Jack Quaid was nominated for the Best Hero Award at the MTV Movie & TV Awards for portraying Hughie Campbell.

References

American comics characters
The Boys characters
Characters created by Garth Ennis
Comics characters introduced in 2006
DC Comics characters who can move at superhuman speeds
DC Comics characters who can teleport
DC Comics characters with accelerated healing
DC Comics characters with superhuman senses
DC Comics characters with superhuman strength
Dynamite Entertainment characters
Fictional hackers
Fictional victims of sexual assault
Fictional characters with post-traumatic stress disorder
Vigilante characters in comics
Vigilante television series
Scottish comics characters
WildStorm characters